Young Woodley is a 1930 British drama film directed by Thomas Bentley and starring Madeleine Carroll, Frank Lawton, Sam Livesey, and Gerald Rawlinson.

Production
The film was based on the controversial 1925 play Young Woodley by John Van Druten. Bentley had previously directed a 1928 silent version, but the film was never released, and he re-made it in sound using some of the same actors. A school prefect becomes attracted to the headmaster's wife. The film, like the play, was noted for its subversive attitude to authority. The pompous and cold headmaster is portrayed as the villain of the work. The film was not a major success when it was released despite its large budget and well-known subject matter.

Cast
Madeleine Carroll as Laura Simmons 
Frank Lawton as Woodley 
Sam Livesey as Mr. Simmons 
Gerald Rawlinson as Milner 
Billy Milton as Vining 
Aubrey Mather as Mr. Woodley 
John Teed as Ainger 
Anthony Halfpenny as Cope 
René Ray as Kitty 
Fanny Wright as Mother

References

Bibliography
Richards, Jeffrey. The Age of the Dream Palace: Cinema and Society in Britain, 1930-1939. Routledge & Kegan Paul, 1984.

External links

1930 films
Films shot at British International Pictures Studios
1930s English-language films
Films directed by Thomas Bentley
1930 drama films
British drama films
British films based on plays
Films set in England
British black-and-white films
1930s British films